The Pony Club is a voluntary organisation founded in England in 1929. It has now expanded internationally and Pony Club branches can be found worldwide.  It is one of 16 organisations that form the British Equestrian Federation.

The Pony Club was granted independent charitable status on 1 January 1997, and there are around 330 branches and 480 centres in the UK. The Pony Club has been the starting point for a large majority of equestrian team members and medal winners.

History
The Pony Club was formed in Great Britain in 1929 when the Institute of the Horse formed a youth branch of their organization, "The Pony Club." It was formed to encourage children to start riding, while providing them with opportunities in the field that they would not be able to reach on their own. The group grew rapidly, with 300 members in 1930, to over 10,000 in 1935. When the Institute of the Horse joined with National Horse Association of Great Britain to form The British Horse Society, The Pony Club was incorporated in the new group.

Table showing growth over years

Objectives

The objectives of The Pony Club are:

 to encourage young people to ride and to learn to enjoy all kinds of sport connected with horses and riding
 to give instruction in riding and horsemastership and to educate Members to look after and to take proper care of their animal
 to promote the highest ideals of sportsmanship, citizenship and loyalty to create strength of character and self-discipline

The Pony Club promotes the education of young people through the provision of instruction and examination in riding, horse care and animal welfare.  At camps and rallies children are taught best practice in a fun and safe environment.

Structure
The Pony Club is divided into nineteen areas each of which is subdivided into branches. Each branch is administered by a District Commissioner and a voluntary committee. They are in charge of organising activities for the branch.

Membership
There are two types of membership, Branch membership and Centre membership. Branch members must have their own pony or be able to borrow one to participate in activities. However Centre membership is run by Riding Schools and the members use the ponies belonging to the Riding School. Membership is open to anyone up until the end of the year in which they turn 25.

Competitions are held at Branches and Centres, and the National Championships allow Members to compete at the highest level.  Tests and competitions help young people to develop potential and encourage them to strive for the highest standards of equestrian achievement.  Many former Members go on to compete at international competitions which helps to raise the international sporting profile of the nation.

Tests and Achievement Badges
The Pony Club encourages its members to take several Efficiency Tests on Riding and Horsemanship. The Tests range from E Standard all the way through to the prestigious A Standard. The tests must all be completed in progression, however the E and B+ tests are optional. The Riding and Road Safety Test also must be completed which ensures that members have the necessary knowledge to ride a horse or pony on the road. The B Standard Test demonstrates a high level of riding and horse care and the A Test is thought of highly by employers in the horse industry as the holder of an A Test certificate has proven to have an extremely high level of riding and horsemanship.

The Pony Club offers Mini Achievement Badges for younger Members as well as both equine and non-equine Achievement Badges. Both types of achievement badge help Members to learn a wide range of skills like the care of your horse or pony first-aid, farming, map reading, saddlery, road safety and grooming.

Sports
The Pony Club holds competitions in the following Sports:
Dressage, Endurance,
Eventing,
Showjumping,
Mounted Games,
Polo,
Polocrosse, Pony Racing, and
Tetrathlon

Pony Club Camp
The highlight of The Pony Club calendar for many children is the annual Pony Club Camp, organised by the branch or centre. This allows for all members to spend additional time with their rides, often in a new setting doing a variety of activities, including cross country as well as the typical mounted games.

References

External links
The Pony Club U.K.

Clubs and societies in the United Kingdom
Horses in the United Kingdom
Kenilworth
Organisations based in Warwickshire
Youth organizations established in 1929
1929 establishments in the United Kingdom